Jordan Baker-Caldwell (born 1983) is an American artist known for his large scale abstract and figurative works—such as his 9-foot-tall steel sculpture Ascension, which is permanently installed in Midtown Manhattan.

References

External links
Official website

1983 births
Living people
Sculptors from New York (state)
Alfred University alumni
20th-century American sculptors
American male sculptors
20th-century American male artists